Ixhuatlán del Café is a city in the Mexican state of Veracruz.  It serves as the municipal seat of the municipality of the same name.

The municipality covers a total surface area of 134.07 km2 and, in the 2000 census, reported a population of 19,945.

Its chief products are corn, coffee and fruits.

External links
Municipal website

Populated places in Veracruz